Major S.D. Singh Medical College & Hospital is a private medical college and hospital located near Fatehgarh in Farrukhabad district, Uttar Pradesh, India. The college affiliated to Chhatrapati Shahu Ji Maharaj University, Kanpur was established in 2011.

References

Private medical colleges in India
Medical colleges in Uttar Pradesh
Farrukhabad district
Colleges affiliated to Chhatrapati Shahu Ji Maharaj University
Educational institutions established in 2011
2011 establishments in Uttar Pradesh
Hospitals in Uttar Pradesh